Richard (Dick) Maskel (born July 4, 1954, in Kapuskasing, Ontario, Canada) is an American curler from Green Bay, Wisconsin.

Teams

Men's

Mixed

References

External links
 

Living people
1954 births
People from Kapuskasing
Sportspeople from Green Bay, Wisconsin
American male curlers
American curling champions
Continental Cup of Curling participants
Canadian emigrants to the United States